The Hindu religious text Manusmriti describes Brahmavarta as the region between the rivers Sarasvati and Drishadvati in India. The text defines the area as the place where the "good" people are born. The name has been translated in various ways, including "holy land", "sacred land", "abode of gods", and "the scene of creation".

The precise location and size of the region has been the subject of academic uncertainty. Some scholars, such as the archaeologists Bridget and Raymond Allchin, believe the term Brahmavarta to be synonymous with the Aryavarta region.

Literature 
According to the Manusmriti, the purity of a place and its inhabitants decreased the further it was from Brahmavarta. Aryan (noble) people were believed to inhabit the "good" area and the proportion of Mleccha (barbarian) people in the population rose as the distance from it increased. This implies a series of concentric circles of decreasing purity as one moved away from the Brahmavarta centre.

The translation of Manusmriti made by Patrick Olivelle, a professor of Sanskrit, says: 

The French Indologist who later converted to Hinduism, Alain Daniélou, notes that the Rig Veda, which is an earlier Hindu text, describes the region later known as Brahmavarta as the heartland of Aryan communities and the geography described in it suggests that those communities had not moved much beyond the area. He says that later texts, contained in the Brahmanas, indicate that the centre of religious activity had moved from Brahmavarta to an adjacent area southeast of it known as Brahmarisihidesha. Again, some sources consider Brahmarisihidesh a to be synonymous with Brahmavarta.
Seal dated to Gupta period with inscription 'Brahma Varta'' was excavated from Purana Qila, Delhi.

See also 
Brahmarshi

References 
Notes

Citations

Locations in Hindu mythology